Angelo Maria Mazzia (October 1823 in Roggiano Gravina, Province of Cosenza – 1891 in Naples) was an Italian painter. He was son of the painter Francesco Mazzia.

Biography
He began to study a classical education in Letters at the Seminary of San Marco, but when he was given a half-stipend by the province, he moved to Naples to study Veterinary Medicine, but in Naples he gravitated to study design under professor Giuseppe Cammarano, until he gained another scholarship to study painting at the Royal Academy of Fine Arts in Naples. Exempt from military service when he won a contest, in 1860 he became instructor of the Institute of Fine Arts, where introduced his text on Geometric Design, and in 1872, he won a position as professor of Design at the school in Portici.

Among his works: Homer at the tomb of Hector, illustrated by Bozzelli and various portraits of famous Calabresi illustri. At the exhibition of 1854, he made a painting done with models: St Sebastian after his Martyrdom; exhibited in 1859 and awarded a gold medal, L'Assunta con coro d'Angeli; Santa Cristina (once at the Royal Palace of Caserta); The Virgin of the Catacombs (1861, Pinacoteca di Capodimonte); Pope Clement VII and Emperor Charles V (1864); Dante nella bolgia degli Ipocriti (1866); Dante nella luce, Rome nelle tenebre (1872).

He was awarded the Cross of a Knight of the Order of the Crown of Italy, and was honorary president of the Society of the mechanical operators in Portici. His portrait of Errico Petrella is found in the picture gallery of the Conservatorio di musica San Pietro a Majella. Enrico Salfi was one of his pupils.

References

1823 births
1891 deaths
People from the Province of Cosenza
19th-century Italian painters
Italian male painters
Painters from Naples
19th-century Italian male artists